Caballeros de la Quema ("la quema" is a reference to the fans of Club Atlético Huracán) is an Argentine rock band, led by Iván Noble.

Biography
The band was established in 1990, with the line-up of Iván Noble (singer), Pablo Guerra and Martín Méndez (guitars), Alejandro Sorraires and Martín “Cafusa” Staffolari (sax), Javier “Nene” Cavo (drums) and Martín Carro Vila (bass). They released their first CD, "Primavera Negra", in 1991. Their second work, "Manos vacías", was released in 1993, with the songs "Carlito" and "Patri". They played for Joaquín Sabina at the Arquitecto Ricardo Etcheverry stadium, and took part in a big concert with La Renga and Los Piojos at the 9 de Julio Avenue. 

Castillo left the band, being replaced by Carro Villa. The band made a new CD, "Sangrando", and played for Aerosmith. Sorraires left the band, which made another CD, "Perros, perros y perros". This CD included the song "No chamuyés" and had León Gieco as an invited artist. 

"La paciencia de la araña" was recorded in 1998, with the famous song "Avanti morocha". The huge success led to a live album on the same year. The song does not have any political content, but it was used years later during the 2011 general election to promote the re-election of the president Cristina Fernández de Kirchner. They also included the song "Mothers", which talks about the Mothers of the Plaza de Mayo. Iván Noble became famous at the gossip magazines because of a brief romance with Natalia Oreiro. "Fulanos de nadie" was released in 2000, and "Otro jueves cobarde" in 2001. The band broke up in that year, and Iván Noble continued with a solo career.

Members
 Iván Noble (singer)
 Pablo Guerra (guitars)
 Martín Méndez (guitars)
 Alejandro Sorraires (sax)
 Martín “Cafusa” Staffolari (sax)
 Javier “Nene” Cavo (drums)
 Martín Carro Vila (bass)

Discography
 Primavera negra - 1991
 Manos vacías - 1993
 Sangrando - 1994
 Perros, perros y perros - 1996
 La paciencia de la araña - 1998
 En Vivo Obras I&II - 1999 (Live album)
 Fulanos de nadie - 2000
 Obras cumbres I&II - 2006 (Greatest hits album)

References

Argentine alternative rock groups
Musical groups established in 1990
Musical groups disestablished in 2001